Jason Gorber is a Canadian film critic and interviewer based in Toronto. He is a featured reviewer on the CTV News Channel, where he has a weekly review segment on Sunday nights. In 2013, he began hosting a weekend movie program on the Oprah Winfrey Network (OWN) in Canada. Gorber is a featured critic for Twitch Film, a regular contributor to Huffington Post/Moviefone, a Rotten Tomatoes accredited critic, and has contributed freelance articles to several print publications. He is a regular contributor at POV Magazine, both in print and online, where he covers festivals including Berlin, Sundance, Hot Docs, and TIFF, and has interviewed filmmakers including Werner Herzog and Asif Kapadia.

Gorber's profile at the Online Film Critics Society describes him as "a pioneer in online film criticism." He has been an accredited reviewer at the Toronto International Film Festival since 1997 and created the site filmfest.ca to document the festival's activities. He is the managing editor and chief film critic of That Shelf, a Toronto-based website covering film, television, and gaming.

In early 2013, he wrote a piece in the Toronto Star describing his preferred seating locations at many of Toronto's major cinemas. Gorber writes that finding a proper seat is "nearly as important as the film itself" for viewers interested in a full cinematic experience, describing the search as "part art, part science" for a committed few. He has also written reviews of specialty cinemas, in 2013 profiling the Alamo Drafthouse in Austin, Texas.

Gorber has been described by the Canadian Broadcasting Corporation as a "Star Wars fanatic." Following Disney's announcement in late 2012 of plans to create a Star Wars Episode VII (Star Wars: The Force Awakens), he tweeted, "I will be 43 years old in 2015, and yet I will still be lining up. This is what I do. So, who's with me in line?"

References

External links
TwitchFilm profile

Living people
Canadian film critics
People from Toronto
Year of birth missing (living people)